Ioannis A. Drosopoulos (Sourpi, Magnesia,  – Athens, 27 July 1939) was a Greek economist who acted as Subgovernor and Governor of the National Bank of Greece.

Biography 
He was hired in the National Bank at a young age and worked in it for thirty two years in total. In 1911 he was promoted to the position of General Inspector, and then to that of Director and in 1914 was elected Subgovernor. In 1928 he became Governor of the Bank of Greece, a position in which he remained until his death.

He was one of the first settlers of Ekali.

He died on 27 July 1939 in Athens. Athanasios Drosopoulos was his son.

Sources

References

External links 
 Ioannis Drosopoulos in Pandektis, by National Hellenic Research Foundation

Governors of the Bank of Greece
Greek bankers
20th-century Greek economists
1870 births
1939 deaths
People from Sourpi
19th-century Greek economists